Tamika Galanis is a Black Bahamian artist examining topics of Bahamian identity and culture, tourism, and archival histories.

After completing the Associate of Arts program at the College of the Bahamas, she received her Masters of Fine Arts in Experimental and Documentary Arts from Duke University in 2016. Galanis is the Jon B. Lovelace Fellow for the Study of the Alan Lomax Collection at the John W. Kluge Center at the Library of Congress.

Exhibitions 
 Übersee: Kuba und die Bahamas. Gegenwartskunst aus der Karibik, Leipzig, 2017. 
 Atlantic World Art Fair, 2021

See also 
 List of Bahamian women artists

References

Further reading 

 

Living people
Year of birth missing (living people)
Bahamian artists
Bahamian women artists